Budipine (brand name Parkinsan) is an antiparkinson agent marketed for the treatment of Parkinson's disease.

While its exact mechanism of action is not well characterized, it is believed to be an NMDA receptor antagonist, but also promoting the synthesis of dopamine.

Because it provides additional benefits relative to existing treatments, it probably does not precisely mimic the mechanism of an existing known treatment.

Synthesis

4-Phenyl-1-t-butyl-4-piperidinol, (1)

1-t-butyl-3-benzoyl-4-phenyl-4-piperidinol [81831-81-4] (3)

See also 
 AD-1211
 Delucemine
 Diphenidine
 Ephenidine
 Fluorolintane
 Lanicemine
 Methoxphenidine (MXP)
 MT-45
 Remacemide

References 

Antiparkinsonian agents
Drugs with unknown mechanisms of action
4-Phenylpiperidines
Tert-butyl compounds
Benzhydryl compounds